Kaija Marja Mustonen (born 4 August 1941) is a former speed skater from Finland.

After winning silver and bronze at the 1964 Winter Olympics of Innsbruck, Mustonen went on to win gold and silver at the 1968 Winter Olympics of Grenoble. This was the only Finnish gold medal at those games and the last Olympic gold for Finland in speed skating up to at least 2015. Her Olympic performance was acknowledged by naming her Finnish female athlete of the year in 1964 and 1968.

She competed in ten World Allround Championships from 1958 to 1968 (every year except 1959), but never won a medal in the final classification – a fourth place in 1964 being her best result. She did win four distance medals though, all bronze, in the days when there was not yet a separate world championship for each distance. Nationally, she won seven all-around titles between 1962 and 1968.

Personal records

References

Notes

Bibliography

 Eng, Trond. All Time International Championships, Complete Results 1889 - 2002. Askim, Norway: WSSSA Skøytenytt, 2002.
 Kolkka, Sulo. Suomen Luisteliiton Vuosikirja, Pikaluistelija 1967 (in Finnish). Helsinki, Finland: E.o. Savolaisen Kirjapaino ky, 1967.
 Peltoperä, Pentti. Suomen Luisteliiton Vuosikirja 1965 (in Finnish). Helsinki, Finland: E.o. Savolaisen Kirjapaino ky, 1965.
 Peltoperä, Pentti. Suomen Luisteliiton Vuosikirja 1966 (in Finnish). Helsinki, Finland: E.o. Savolaisen Kirjapaino ky, 1966.
 Santala, Martti en Pajunen, Aarno. Pikaluistelija 1/1968 (in Finnish). Helsinki, Finland: Suomen Luisteliitto, 1968.
 Teigen, Magne. Komplette resultater, Internasjonale Mesterskap 1889-1989 (in Norwegian). Veggli, Norway: WSSSA Skøytenytt, 1989.

External links
 Kaija Mustonen at SkateResults.com

1941 births
Living people
Sportspeople from Helsinki
Finnish female speed skaters
Olympic speed skaters of Finland
Speed skaters at the 1964 Winter Olympics
Speed skaters at the 1968 Winter Olympics
Olympic gold medalists for Finland
Olympic silver medalists for Finland
Olympic bronze medalists for Finland
Olympic medalists in speed skating
Medalists at the 1964 Winter Olympics
Medalists at the 1968 Winter Olympics